Kristin Robbins (born April 29, 1968) is an American politician serving in the Minnesota House of Representatives since 2019. A member of the Republican Party of Minnesota, Robbins represents District 34A in the northwestern Twin Cities metropolitan area, including the city of Maple Grove and parts of Hennepin County.

Early life, education, and career
Robbins was raised in Crookston, Minnesota. She attended Bethel University, graduating with a Bachelor of Arts in economics and political science, and Washington University in St. Louis, graduating with a Master of Arts in economics.

Robbins was formerly the legislative director for U.S. Representative Harris Fawell and a deputy chair of the Senate District 34 Republicans. She was the executive director of the Economic Club of Minnesota.

Minnesota House of Representatives
Robbins was elected to the Minnesota House of Representatives in 2018, after incumbent Joyce Peppin retired, and has been reelected every two years since.

Robbins has served as an assistant minority leader since 2023 and sits on the Higher Education Finance and Policy, Rules and Legislative Administration, and Taxes Committees.

Electoral history

Personal life
Robbins and her husband, Brent, have three children. She resides in Maple Grove, Minnesota.

References

External links

 Official House of Representatives website
 Official campaign website

1968 births
Living people
Republican Party members of the Minnesota House of Representatives
21st-century American politicians
21st-century American women politicians
Women state legislators in Minnesota
Bethel University (Minnesota) alumni
Washington University in St. Louis alumni